A-class submarine may refer to one of these classes of submarine:

 , a class of 13 submarines of the Royal Navy that served in World War I
 , a class of six built for the Royal Danish Navy, 1911–1914
 , a class built for the Royal Norwegian Navy in 1913
 , also later known as Soviet A-class submarine, submarines launched in 1916
 , a class of three Spanish submarines launched in 1917
 , a class of seven United States Navy submarines built before World War I; also known as the "A class"
  (also called the Archeron class), a class of sixteen submarines of the Royal Navy that served in World War II; also known as the "A class"
 The Japanese Type A submarine, three classes submarines:
 I-9-class submarine (Type A1 submarine)
 I-12-class submarine (Type A2 submarine)
 I-13-class submarine (Type AM submarine)

Submarine classes